Keith Long (born 14 November 1973) is an Irish football manager and former footballer. He was most recently the manager of League of Ireland Premier Division team Bohemians
 
Long is a former Bray Wanderers player, assistant manager and was previously caretaker manager before taking over in November 2011 from Pat Devlin.

Long also played for Stoke City before joining Dundalk in 1993 and then St Patrick's Athletic before joining Bray Wanderers in 2000 where he played 138 games before retiring in 2005.

His first league goal was the winner for Dundalk at Eamonn Deacy Park on 4 November 1995.

Long made a substitute appearance in the 1995–96 UEFA Cup at the Malmö Stadion

On 29 April 2014, he was named as manager of Athlone Town.

He could not prevent Athlone Town's relegation from the League of Ireland Premier Division and departed the club to become manager of Bohemians on 30 October 2014. On 30 August 2022, a day after a 3–1 home defeat to St Patrick's Athletic, he was sacked by Bohs without winning a major trophy during his 8 years at the club.

Managerial statistics

Honours

St Patrick's Athletic
League of Ireland Premier Division (1)
 1997–98

Bohemians
'''Leinster Senior Cup
2015-16

References

Republic of Ireland association footballers
Association football utility players
Association footballers from Dublin (city)
League of Ireland players
Living people
Dundalk F.C. players
St Patrick's Athletic F.C. players
Bray Wanderers F.C. players
League of Ireland managers
1973 births
Bray Wanderers F.C. managers
Association football defenders
Republic of Ireland football managers
Bohemian F.C. managers
Athlone Town A.F.C. managers